Frederick, Count of Saarbrücken (died 1135) was a German nobleman.  He was the first to style himself Count of Saarbrücken.

Life 
His father, Siegbert, was a count in the Saargau; his mother may have been a daughter of the Lord of Eppenstein.  His brother Bruno was Bishop of Speyer; his brother Adalbert I was Archbishop-Elector of Mainz.

In 1105 Frederick inherited his father's position.  In 1118, he was called Count of Saarbrücken for the first time.  He was vassal of the Bishop of Metz.

Marriage and issue 
Frederick was married to Gisela of Lorraine, who brought possessions around Hornbach Abbey into the marriage.  They had three children:
 Agnes, married  to Duke Frederick II of Swabia
 Simon I, his successor
 Adalbert II, was Archbishop-Elector of Mainz from 1138 to 1141.

References 
 

Counts of Saarbrücken
12th-century German nobility
11th-century births
1135 deaths
Year of birth unknown